Sathkampa is a 2002 Sri Lankan Sinhala drama film directed by Chandraratne Mapitigama and produced by Rohana Gunaratne. It stars Sabeetha Perera and Somy Rathnayake in lead roles along with W. Jayasiri and Manike Attanayake. Music composed by Nawaratne Gamage. It is the 993th Sri Lankan film in the Sinhala cinema.

Plot

Cast
 Sabeetha Perera as Kumari
 Somy Rathnayake as Dharmadasa
 Manike Attanayake as Yasawathi
 W. Jayasiri as Benjamin
 Vasantha Vittachchi as Mudalali
 Cletus Mendis as Saliya
 Sathischandra Edirisinghe as Kumari's father
 Grace Ariyawimal as Kumari's mother
 Damitha Saluwadana as Mudalali's wife
 Upasena Subasinghe
 Prasanna Fonseka

References

2002 films
2000s Sinhala-language films